Sergio Iesi (born 8 April 1912, date of death unknown) was a Uruguayan foil fencer. He competed at the 1948 and 1952 Summer Olympics.

References

External links
 

1912 births
Year of death missing
Uruguayan male foil fencers
Olympic fencers of Uruguay
Fencers at the 1948 Summer Olympics
Fencers at the 1952 Summer Olympics
20th-century Uruguayan people